The Vojvodina's Party (VP) is a political party in Serbia that operates in Vojvodina.

Party platform 
It calls for a change of the Constitution of Serbia, which would reform the current republic with two autonomous provinces, into a state with at least two federal units, Vojvodina and Serbia Proper. It supports renaming Vojvodina to Republic of Vojvodina. It has been accused of separatism, although the party has denied the claims.

It stated its support for the "Together for Vojvodina" ballot list in the 2022 general election.

History 
The party was formed in 2005 by unifying several democratic autonomist political organizations and movements in Vojvodina (Vojvodinian Civic Movement, Vojvodinian Movement, and Autonomous Movement of Vojvodina), as well as a group of former members of the League of Social Democrats of Vojvodina, gathered around Igor Kurjački.

Party Structure

Overview 

Unlike as is the case with most parties and other organizations in the region, bureaucracy is kept at such levels, as the organization and needs call for. The party follows a simple structure of a number of levels of organization.

The core of the party, is based around a presidency, a number of committees and bodies. The rest of the party is based around regional committees that correspond to their local level of local government, within which they implement the party's goals.

Just some of the other bodies are the Youth Organization Mlada Vojvodina (eng. Vojvodina Youth) and Women's Organization Forum Žena (eng. Women's Forum).

Party Leaders 
Current
Aleksandar Odžić (2009–present)
Previous

Igor Kurjački (2005-2009)

References

External links 
 Official Website

Politics of Vojvodina
Left-wing parties in Serbia
Regionalist parties